Terminate (terminat.exe) was a shareware modem terminal and host program for MS-DOS and compatible operating systems, developed during the 1990s by Bo Bendtsen from Denmark.

The latest release (5.00) arrived in 1997, and the first release arrived on 2 April 1992 (according to the WHATSNEW.500 text file included with version 5.00).

Compared to similar programs of its time, Terminate had a large number of built-in features like: a powerful phone book with long distance calling cost calculation, Fido Mailer, QWK offline mail reader, file manager, text editor, keyboard mapping, ISDN support , fax and voice-call features, chat, IEMSI, VGA mode detection, audio CD player, and a REXX-like scripting language. 

Supported terminal emulation modes included ASCII, Avatar, ANSI, RIP, VT102, and others.  A number of file transfer protocols like Zmodem were built into the application, along with support for external protocols like HS/Link and BiModem. The built-in support for advanced file transfer protocols made Terminate very popular at the time.

The installation program could import the phone book and settings from other applications like: Telix, RemoteAccess, FrontDoor, BinkleyTerm, Portal of Power, as well as (indirectly) Minicom and Commo.

External links
 Official Web-site (archived 1998-06-27)
 Terminate - the final terminal - a June 1995 article from the PC Update Magazine

Terminal emulators
DOS software
Bulletin board system software